The 2023 Aranese Council Election, will be held on Sunday, 28 May 2023, to elect the General Council of Aran, an administrative entity in the province of Lleida (Spain). All 13 seats in the council will be up for election. The election will be held simultaneously with regional elections in twelve autonomous communities and local elections all throughout Spain.

Overview

Electoral system 
The General Council of Aran is elected every four years on the basis of universal suffrage, which comprises all nationals over eighteen who can vote in the local elections in any of the 9 municipalities that make up Aran. It was officially established after the 1991 elections and is made up of 13 members. According to Law 16/1990, of July 13, on the special regime of the Val d'Aran, it is made up of the Síndic d'Aran, the General Councilors (Occitan: Conselhers Generaus), that work in plenary, and by the Commission of Accounts Auditors (Occitan: Commission d'Auditors de Compdes).

In every election, electors choose the General Councilors, that will later elect the Síndic, who acts as the head of government. Aran is divided in six electoral districts, whose borders coincide with those of the "thirds" (Occitan: Terçon, Catalan: Terçó, Spanish: Tersón), a traditional division of the valley. In every district, members are allocated using the proportional D'Hônt method with closed lists, with an electoral threshold of five percent of the valid votes in every district. The use of the D'Hondt method may result in a higher effective threshold, depending on the district magnitude.

On the 2019 election, members were distributed in the following way:

As Catalonia has not developed its own electoral law, Aranese elections are regulated by Organic Law No. 5 of 19 June 1985, which regulates elections nationwide.

Election date 
The date of the elections is set for the same day that local elections are held in Spain, that is, the fourth Sunday of May every 4 years.

Parties and candidates 
The electoral law allowed for parties and federations registered in the interior ministry, coalitions and groupings of electors to present lists of candidates. Parties and federations intending to form a coalition ahead of an election were required to inform the relevant Electoral Commission within ten days of the election call, whereas groupings of electors needed to secure the signature of at least one percent of the electorate in the constituencies for which they sought election, disallowing electors from signing for more than one list of candidates.

Below is a list of the main parties and electoral alliances which will likely contest the election:

See also 

 2023 Spanish local elections

References

Future elections in Spain
2023 elections in Spain